Daybreak on a Different Mountain is a novel by Colin Greenland published in 1984.

Plot summary
Daybreak on a Different Mountain is a novel in which a fighter and a mystical poet leave their sealed city to go on a quest.

Reception
Dave Langford reviewed Daybreak on a Different Mountain for White Dwarf #61, and stated that "I found this one unusually well written, but short on narrative energy."

Reviews
Review by Faren Miller (1985) in Locus, #288 January 1985
Review by Brian Stableford (1985) in Fantasy Review, June 1985
Review by Christopher Fowler (1985) in Interzone, #12 Summer 1985
Review by Don D'Ammassa (1986) in Science Fiction Chronicle, #86 November 1986

References

1984 British novels